Delphinium pavonaceum (syn. Delphinium × pavonaceum) is a species of flowering plant in the buttercup family known by the common name peacock larkspur. It is endemic to Oregon in the United States, where it is limited to the Willamette Valley.

This larkspur has white sepals and blue upper petals. It is likely a hybrid between Delphinium menziesii and D. trolliifolium. It grows up to 90 centimeters tall from a network of tubers. The inflorescence is pyramidal, with the lower pedicels much longer than the upper. Flowering occurs in April through June. Flowers are pollinated by bumblebees.

This plant grows on prairies and floodplains, in well-drained areas. Associated plants include Potentilla gracilis, Deschampsia cespitosa, Poa pratensis, Rosa spp., Spiraea douglasii, Rubus spp., Rhus diversiloba, and Fraxinus latifolia.

Threats to the species include loss of habitat to urban development and agriculture, as well as herbicides and hybridization.

References

External links

pavonaceum
Flora of Oregon
Flora without expected TNC conservation status
Endemic flora of Oregon
Endemic flora of the United States